Sejong, officially the Sejong Special Self-Governing City, is a special self-governing city and de facto administrative capital of South Korea.

Sejong was founded in 2007 as the new planned capital of South Korea from many parts of the South Chungcheong province and some parts of North Chungcheong province to ease congestion in South Korea's current capital and largest city, Seoul, and encourage investment in the country's central region. Since 2012, the government of South Korea has relocated numerous ministries and agencies to Sejong, but many still reside in other cities, primarily Seoul, where the National Assembly and many important government bodies remain.

Sejong has a population of 351,007 as of 2020 and covers a geographic area of 465.23 km2 (179.63 sq mi), making it the least-populous and smallest first-level administrative division in South Korea. Sejong is located in the west-central Hoseo region, bordering South Chungcheong to the west, Daejeon Metropolitan City to the south, and North Chungcheong to the east.

The construction of the city is expected to be completed in 2030, at which time 500,000 people are expected to live there.

Name

Sejong was named in honor of King Sejong the Great, the fourth king of the Joseon Dynasty and creator of the Korean alphabet, Hangul. The city was formed by combining Yeongi County, the county of South Chungcheong Province from which the majority of the city's territory was ceded, and other counties.

History 

In 2003, then-President Roh Moo-hyun sought to relocate the national capital of South Korea from the metropolitan city of Seoul to a new multifunctional administrative city in the center of the country. The goal was to reduce the influence and dominance of Seoul on national governance and economics, whilst promoting the regional development of other areas of the country. According to the former Interior Minister Maeng Hyung-gyu in 2012, "Sejong is a symbol of the country's efforts toward more balanced regional development," helping to decongest Seoul and spur investment in the country's central region.

In October 2004, the Constitutional Court dealt a setback to President Roh's plans, ruling that the capital must remain in Seoul in response to a complaint filed by the main opposition, the conservative Grand National Party. As such, the Roh administration was forced to modify the project to relocate the majority of government ministries and institutions to Sejong, which would become a special administrative city instead of a new capital. The revised plan was approved by the National Assembly in March 2005. Challenges to the new plan were rejected by the Constitutional Court in November 2005.

When the Grand National Party retook the presidential office in 2008, then-President Lee Myung-bak opposed the idea of moving government agencies, claiming that it would hurt Seoul's global competitiveness and result in inefficiency. Following Lee's directions, plans were made to make Sejong an industrial, science and education hub instead. This plan was opposed by many, including Roh's allies and some members of the ruling Grand National Party, including Lee's arch-rival and eventual successor, Park Geun-hye. Defeat in the mid-2010 local elections forced Lee to present his proposal to the National Assembly where it was voted down.

In July 2012, Sejong Special Self-Governing City was created by combining all of Yeongi County, three townships of Gongju and one township of Cheongwon County.

In April 2013, the city government of Putrajaya, Malaysia signed a letter of intent (LOI) with the government of Sejong City to mark cooperation between the two planned capitals.

, 12 ministries were relocated to the city. As such, only 5 ministries continue to remain in Seoul; the Ministry Of Foreign Affairs, Ministry of Unification, Ministry of Justice, Ministry of National Defense, and Ministry of Gender Equality and Family.

Sejong was specifically designed to be a "smart city", and is sometimes referred to as Sejong smart city. It is the leading smart city in Korea, and is often held up as the standard for other cities experimenting with the development of smart city infrastructure.

By 2019, there was disagreement among experts as to whether Sejong had "lived up to expectations. ...Sejong uses its new development to market itself as an alternative to Seoul, offering luxury living at a fraction of the cost. It boasts shiny state-of-the-art condominiums, ample public green space and smart and sustainable city tech, like automated trash collection and zero-waste food disposal, electric car charging and sharing stations, solar-powered buildings, interactive digital signage, closed-circuit television security and fine dust emergency alerts. [It] has sparked criticism that the new city is not only too lackluster to draw residents away from Seoul, but also difficult to access and poorly designed."

Geography
Sejong is surrounded by the two provinces of Chungcheongnam-do, and Chungcheongbuk-do, as well as the metropolitan city of Daejeon.

Cityscape
As of 2012 much of the city was under construction. The residential area, by 2012, had several high-rises built for transferees. At that time the residential area was cordoned off from much of the under-development governmental area and had some restaurants, six schools, and one grocery store.

Climate
Sejong City has a humid continental climate (Köppen: Dwa), but can be considered a borderline humid subtropical climate (Köppen: Cwa) using the  isotherm.

Administrative divisions
The 10 haengjeong-dong and Jochiwon-eup is the city main urban center. Sejong is divided into 12 haengjeong-dong (administrative neighborhood), 1 eup (town) and 9 myeon (townships).

 Notes There are no Hanja for Hansol, Dodam, Areum, Goun, Boram, Serom, Sodam, Dajeong, or Haemil as they are native Korean words.

Population and demographics
The city aimed to have a population of 200,000 in 2012, 300,000 by 2020 and 500,000 by 2030. As of 2017, Sejong had a population of 281,120.

, Sejong had a higher proportion of children compared to the South Korean average.

As of June 30, 2020, Sejong has a population of 351,007.

Religion 
The census from 2015 indicated that the majority of Sejong residents did not belong to any particular religion. Protestantism was the most common religion with around 19.9% of the population being adherents, followed by Buddhism at 13.9% and Roman Catholicism at 7.9%.

Government buildings

The South Korean government plans to move 36 government ministries and agencies to Sejong City.
Government Complex Sejong is located in Sejong City. The complex, on a  plot of land, has seven stories and one basement. Construction began in November 2011 in what was South Chungcheong Province, and the complex was completed on November 16, 2013. The ceremony to mark the movement of several government agencies to the complex occurred on December 23, 2013.

Government Complex Sejong includes the head offices of: 
Office of the Prime Minister (OPM)
Ministry of Economy and Finance (MOEF)
Ministry of Education (MOE)
Ministry of Science and ICT (MSIT)
Ministry of the Interior and Safety (MOIS)
Ministry of Culture, Sports and Tourism (MCST)
Ministry of Agriculture, Food and Rural Affairs (MAFRA) 
Ministry of Trade, Industry and Energy (MOTIE)
Ministry of Health and Welfare (MOHW)
Ministry of Environment (ME) 
Ministry of Employment and Labor (MOEL)
Ministry of Land, Infrastructure and Transport (MOLIT)
Ministry of Oceans and Fisheries (MOF) 
Ministry of SMEs and Startups (MSS)
Ministry of Patriots and Veterans Affairs (MPVA)
Ministry of Personnel Management (MPM)
Ministry of Government Legislation (MOLEG)
National Tax Service (NTS)
National Agency for Administrative City Construction (NAACC)
Fair Trade Commission (KFTC)
Anti-Corruption and Civil Rights Commission (ACRC)

Several MOLIT agencies, the Korea Office of Civil Aviation (KOCA), the Korean Maritime Safety Tribunal (KMST), and the Aviation and Railway Accident Investigation Board (ARAIB), have their headquarters in Government Complex Sejong.

Culture 

Sejong Lake Park was completed in March 2013 and has various theme facilities in the park, including the square fountain. The size is 705,768m2 and the lake area is 322,800m2.

The National Sejong Arboretum is the first urban arboretum in Korea and the largest indoor arboretum in Korea. There are 1.72 million plants of 2834 species available. There is an admission fee of 5,000 won for adults.

Education

Universities
KDI School of Public Policy and Management
Hongik University 
Korea University Sejong Campus
Global Consortium University
 Daejeon Catholic University
 Korea University of Media Arts

Senior High Schools
All schools are public schools.
Bugang Engineering High School
Chochiwon Girls' High School
Hansol High School
Sejong Academy of Science and Arts
Sejong High School
Seongnam High School or Sungnam High School

Middle schools

All schools are public schools.
Areum Middle School
Bugang Middle School
Chochiwon Middle School
Chochiwon Girls' Middle School
Dajeong Middle School
Duru Middle School
Cho Darm Middle School
Dodam Middle School
Duru Middle School
Eojin Middle School
Geonui Middle School
Geumho Middle School
Gowoon Middle School
Hansol Middle School
Jangki Middle School
Jiu Middle School
Jongchon Middle School
Saerom Middle School
Saetteum Middle School
Saeum Middle School
Suhyun Middle School
Yangji Middle School
Yeondong Middle School
Yeonseo Middle School

Elementary schools
All schools are public schools.
Bangok Elementary School
Boram Elementary School
Bugang Elementary School
Chamsam Elementary School
Chochiwon Daedong Elementary School
Chochiwon Kyodong Elementary School
Chochiwon Myeongdong Elementary School
Chochiwon Shinbong Elementary School
Geonui Elementary School
Hangyeol Elementary School
Hansol Elementary School
Jangki Elementary School
Jeondong Elementary School
Jeonui Elementary School
Kamsung Elementary School
Keumnam Elementary School
Sojeong Elementary School
Solbit Elementary School
Soowang Elementary School
Ssangryu Elementary School
Uirang Elementary School
Yeonbong Elementary School
Yeondong Elementary School
Yeongidowon Elementary School
Yeonnam Elementary School
Yeonseo Elementary school
Yeoul Elementary School

Transportation

Air
Sejong is served by Cheongju International Airport in Cheongju, the nearest airport to Sejong.

National railway
Sejong is centrally located on Gyeongbu Line operated by Korail. It's a 90-minute journey on the Mugunghwa-ho to Seoul and trains run approximately every 30 minutes. Located just outside Jochiwon-eup limits in Osong, Cheongwon has a KTX station named Osong Station which is a Korea Train Express bullet train that frequently travels . Osong station opened in 2010. There has also been some debate concerning opening another KTX station within the new Sejong City close to the bus terminal to the south.

Daejeon subway Line 1
In April 2019, a feasibility study was completed and approved an extension of Daejeon Metro Line 1 from Banseok station in Daejeon, accessing the southern bus terminal in Sejong, and ending at the Government Complex Sejong. Of the five new stations that are set to open over the new 14 km of tracks, four of which will be in Sejong. Opening is tentatively set for 2029.

In popular culture
The 2015 tvN television series Let's Eat 2 was based in Sejong. During the month of April, various Sejong Spring Festival festivals will be held in various places in the city such as cherry blossoms, peach blossoms, and flower arrangements. Open the 7th cherry blossom festival. On the 14th, we will hold the 'Daehwangang and Ewha Rangwang Hanmadang' on the theme of peach blossoms and flower blossoms. The 2018 Peace Spring Flower Festival of the Sejong Restoration Center will be held under the sponsorship of the Jochiwon, Peach Festival Promotion Committee. It was prepared as a five-sensory satisfaction program to enjoy and enjoy nature such as peach flower, pear flower, rape blossom, and to escape from the performance-oriented festival method.

Gallery

References

Further reading
 Kang, Jeongmuk. "A Study on the Future Sustainability of Sejong, South Korea's Multifunctional Administrative City, Focusing on Implementation of Transit Oriented Development." (Master's Thesis) (Archive) Uppsala University Department of Earth Sciences. Examensarbete i Hållbar Utveckling 93.
 Rahn, Kim. "Mini-capital Sejong City opens" (Archive). The Korea Times. July 1, 2012.
 Ser, Myo-ma and Chun In-sung. "Ministries to start Sejong City move" (Archive). Joongang Daily. December 12, 2013.

External links

 
Multifunctional Administrative City Construction Agency (MACCA)
Automatic Waste Collection in Sejong

 

 
Planned capitals
Planned cities in South Korea
Self-governance
Smart cities
2007 establishments in South Korea